Rho Capricorni (ρ Cap, ρ Capricorni) is a binary star in the constellation Capricornus. Sometimes, this star is called by the name Bos, meaning the cow in Latin.

This system is visible to the naked eye with a combined apparent visual magnitude of +4.78. The pair orbit each other with a period of 278 years and an eccentricity of 0.91. Based upon an annual parallax shift of 33.04 mas as seen from the Earth, the system is located about 99 light years from the Sun. It is a thin disk population star system that made its closest approach to the Sun about 1.6 million years ago when it came within .

The primary member, component A, is a yellow-white hued, F-type subgiant with an apparent magnitude of 4.97 and a stellar classification of F2 IV. This star has 1.5 times the mass of the Sun and 1.3 times the Sun's radius. It is radiating 9 times as much luminosity of the Sun from its outer atmosphere at an effective temperature of 6,911 K. The companion, component B, has a visual magnitude of 6.88. The mass ratio is 0.539, meaning the secondary is only 53.9% as massive as the primary.

References

F-type subgiants
Binary stars
Capricorni, Rho
Capricornus (constellation)
Durchmusterung objects
Capricorni, 11
Gliese and GJ objects
194943
101027
7822